is a solo unit originated in Sendai, Miyagi Prefecture, Tohoku, Japan. The unit belongs to the model talent agency Stepone, headquartered in Sendai as well, under the label Otodama Records.

After Kana Shirato graduated, the group became the solo project of Mari Takahashi. Mari graduated in December 2018 and the group has since been restarted with new members in 2019.

Members

Current members

Past members

 (left in July 2015)
 (left in July 2015)
 (left in July 2015)
 (graduated June 2017)
 (graduated December 2018)

Discography

Albums

Singles

DVDs 
 Journey to Oz Vol.01 [released April 30, 2011]

See also 
Avex Trax

References

External links
Official website
Official website at record label - Universal Music Japan 

Avex Group artists
Japanese girl groups
Japanese idol groups
Japanese pop music groups
Japanese-language singers
Musical groups established in 2010
Musical groups from Miyagi Prefecture
2010 establishments in Japan